Charles C. Bell (August 12, 1868 – February 7, 1937) was an American professional baseball pitcher who pitched in the American Association. Bell was 1–0 with the Kansas City Cowboys, 2-6 for the Louisville Colonels, and 1-0 for the Cincinnati Kelly's Killers (1891).

He pitched in 12 games, completed 10 out of 11 starts, and had an ERA of 3.88 in 95 innings pitched.  He also played one game in the outfield, giving him a total of 13 games played at the major league level.  He had a batting average of .105 (4-for-38), but eight walks pushed his on-base percentage up to .261.  He had four RBI and scored five runs.

Bell was a brother of former major league player Frank Bell, who played for the 1885 Brooklyn Grays.

External links
 Retrosheet
 Baseball Almanac

1868 births
1937 deaths
19th-century baseball players
Major League Baseball pitchers
Kansas City Cowboys players
Louisville Colonels players
Cincinnati Kelly's Killers players
Springfield Senators players
Sioux City Corn Huskers players
Kansas City Blues (baseball) players
Birmingham Grays players
Baseball players from Cincinnati